June 20 - Eastern Orthodox Church calendar - June 22

All fixed commemorations below celebrated on July 4 by Orthodox Churches on the Old Calendar.

For June 21st, Orthodox Churches on the Old Calendar commemorate the Saints listed on June 8.

Saints
 Hieromartyr Tertius of Iconium (Terence), Apostle of the Seventy, Bishop of Iconium (1st century)
 Martyr Julian and his wife Basilissa, and with them Martyrs Celsius, his mother Marcianilla, Anastasius, the priest Anthony, seven brothers, and twenty prison guards, of Antinoe in Egypt (283-305)  (see also: January 8 )
 Martyr Julian of Tarsus in Cilicia (c. 284-305)
 Martyr Aphrodisius in Cilicia.
 Martyrs Kyriakos and Apollinarios, of Africa.
 Saints Julius of Novara, presbyter, and his brother Julian the Deacon (5th century)
 Martyr Archil II, King of Georgia (718 or 744)

Pre-Schism Western saints
 Saints Rufinus and Martia, martyrs in one of the early persecutions in Syracuse in Sicily.
 Saint Urciscenus, Seventh Bishop of Pavia in Italy c 183-216 (c. 216)
 Saint Martin of Tongres, seventh Bishop of Tongres in Belgium, venerated as the Apostle of the Hesbaye region in Brabant (c. 350)
 Saint Demetria, a virgin-martyr in Rome, sister of St Bibiana and daughter of Sts Flavian and Dafrosa (363)
 Saint Alban of Mainz, a Greek priest from Naxos, sent into exile by the Arians, he preached the Gospel in Germany around Mainz, then martyred by the Arians (c. 400)
 Saint Cormac Ua Liatháin (Cormac of the Sea; Corbmac), a disciple of St Columba and Abbot of Durrow Monastery, Ireland (c. 590)
 Saint Méen (Mevenus, Mewan, Maine), a disciple of St Samson, whom he accompanied to Brittany, and founded the monastery of Saint-Méon (617)
 Saint Agofredus, brother of St Leutfrid (Leffroi), and monk at Holy Cross (La-Croix-Saint-Leuffroi), a monastery near Evreux in the north of France (738)
 Saint Leutfrid (Leufroi), founder of the monastery La Croix-Saint-Ouen (later called Saint-Leufroy) near Evreux in France, where he was abbot for nearly fifty years (738)
 Saint Engelmund of Velsen, an English-born Benedictine missionary to Frisia (c. 739)
 Saint Dominic of Comacchio, a monk at Comacchio near Venice in Italy (c. 820)
 Saint Rodulf (Rudolph, Raoul, Ralph), Abbot, and Archbishop of Bourges, Gaul (866)
 Saint Wolfrid, founder of the monastery of Hohentwiel in Germany (c. 990)

Post-Schism Orthodox saints
 Venerable Anastasia of Serbia (Anna), mother of St. Sava (1200)
 Martyr Theodore, right-believing prince of Starodub (1330)
 Martyr Luarsab II, King of Georgia (1622)
 New Martyr Nicetas of Nisyros, near Rhodes, at Chios (1732)

New martyrs and confessors
 New Hieromartyr John Budrin (1918)
 Venerable New Hieroconfessor George (Lavrov), Archimandrite, of Kaluga (1932)
 New Hieromartyr Jonah (Sankov), Hieromonk, of Alpatievo, Moscow (1938)
 New Hieromartyrs Alexis Skvortsov, Paul Uspensky and Nicholas Rozanov, Priests (1938)
 New Martyr Nikita Sukharev (1942)

Other commemorations
 Uncovering of the relics (1996) of St. Maximus the Greek, of Russia (1556)
 Repose of Schemamonk John "the Muscovite," of Valaam (1933)
 Discovery of the Icon of Panagia Eleousa in Xyniada of Domokou (1962)

Icon gallery

Notes

References

Sources
 June 21/July 4. Orthodox Calendar (PRAVOSLAVIE.RU).
 July 4 / June 21. HOLY TRINITY RUSSIAN ORTHODOX CHURCH (A parish of the Patriarchate of Moscow).
 June 21. OCA - The Lives of the Saints.
 The Autonomous Orthodox Metropolia of Western Europe and the Americas (ROCOR). St. Hilarion Calendar of Saints for the year of our Lord 2004. St. Hilarion Press (Austin, TX). p. 46.
 The Twenty-First Day of the Month of June. Orthodoxy in China.
 June 21. Latin Saints of the Orthodox Patriarchate of Rome.
 The Roman Martyrology. Transl. by the Archbishop of Baltimore. Last Edition, According to the Copy Printed at Rome in 1914. Revised Edition, with the Imprimatur of His Eminence Cardinal Gibbons. Baltimore: John Murphy Company, 1916. pp. 180–181.
 Rev. Richard Stanton. A Menology of England and Wales, or, Brief Memorials of the Ancient British and English Saints Arranged According to the Calendar, Together with the Martyrs of the 16th and 17th Centuries. London: Burns & Oates, 1892. pp. 278–281.
Greek Sources
 Great Synaxaristes:  21 ΙΟΥΝΙΟΥ. ΜΕΓΑΣ ΣΥΝΑΞΑΡΙΣΤΗΣ.
  Συναξαριστής. 21 Ιουνίου. ECCLESIA.GR. (H ΕΚΚΛΗΣΙΑ ΤΗΣ ΕΛΛΑΔΟΣ). 
  21 Ιουνίου. Αποστολική Διακονία της Εκκλησίας της Ελλάδος (Apostoliki Diakonia of the Church of Greece).
  21/06/2018. Ορθόδοξος Συναξαριστής. 
Russian Sources
  4 июля (21 июня). Православная Энциклопедия под редакцией Патриарха Московского и всея Руси Кирилла (электронная версия). (Orthodox Encyclopedia - Pravenc.ru).
  21 июня по старому стилю / 4 июля по новому стилю. Русская Православная Церковь - Православный церковный календарь на 2017 год.
  21 июня (ст.ст.) 4 июля 2014 (нов. ст.). Русская Православная Церковь Отдел внешних церковных связей. (DECR).

June in the Eastern Orthodox calendar